Peter Cornell may refer to:
 Peter Cornell (basketball)
 Peter Cornell (singer)